Prayer Meetin' is an album by the American jazz organist Jimmy Smith, recorded in 1963 and released on the Blue Note label. The album was rereleased on CD with two bonus tracks from the same session.

Reception
The AllMusic review by Steve Leggett stated:

Track listing

 "Prayer Meeting" (Jimmy Smith) – 5:45
 "I Almost Lost My Mind" (Ivory Joe Hunter) – 9:25
 "Stone Cold Dead in the Market" (Wilmoth Houdini) – 3:43
 "When the Saints Go Marching In" (Traditional) – 6:15
 "Red Top" (Gene Ammons) – 7:38
 "Picnickin'" (Smith) – 6:30
 "Lonesome Road" (Gene Austin, Nathaniel Shilkret) – 8:55 Bonus track on CD reissue
 "Smith Walk" (Smith) – 7:12 Bonus track on CD reissue

NOTE: "Lonesome Road" and "Smith Walk" are bonus tracks on a CD reissue that were recorded on June 13, 1960, featuring the same lineup plus Sam Jones on bass.

Personnel

Musicians
Jimmy Smith – organ
Stanley Turrentine – tenor saxophone
Quentin Warren – guitar
Donald Bailey – drums
Sam Jones – bass (tracks 7 & 8 only)

Technical
 Alfred Lion – producer
 Rudy Van Gelder – engineer
 Reid Miles – design
 Francis Wolff – photography
 Joe Goldberg – liner notes

Chart performance

Album

References

Blue Note Records albums
Jimmy Smith (musician) albums
1964 albums
Albums recorded at Van Gelder Studio
Albums produced by Alfred Lion